The Inaccessible Islands ("Islas Inaccesibles" in Spanish) are a group of small precipitous islands ranging from  high, the westernmost features of the South Orkney Islands, lying  west of Coronation Island in Antarctica. They were discovered in December 1821 by Captain George Powell, a British sealer in the sloop James Monroe, though it is possible they are the "Seal Islands" seen by Nathaniel Palmer a year earlier. The islands were so named by Powell because of their appearance of inaccessibility.  They are considered part of the British Antarctic Territory by the United Kingdom and part of the Province of Tierra del Fuego by Argentina.

Important Bird Area
The islands have been identified as an Important Bird Area (IBA) by BirdLife International because they support a large breeding colony of southern fulmars (50,000 pairs).  Other birds nesting at the site include chinstrap penguins (1000 pairs) and Antarctic shags (100 pairs).

See also 
 List of Antarctic islands south of 60° S

References

Islands of the South Orkney Islands
Important Bird Areas of Antarctica
Seabird colonies
Penguin colonies